Louise Brough and Margaret duPont defeated the defending champions Shirley Fry and Doris Hart in the final, 4–6, 9–7, 6–3 to win the ladies' doubles tennis title at the 1954 Wimbledon Championships.

Seeds

  Shirley Fry /  Doris Hart (final)
  Louise Brough /  Margaret duPont (champions)
  Angela Mortimer /  Anne Shilcock (semifinals)
  Betty Pratt /  Erika Vollmer (quarterfinals)

Draw

Finals

Top half

Section 1

Section 2

Bottom half

Section 3

Section 4

References

External links

Women's Doubles
Wimbledon Championship by year – Women's doubles
Wimbledon Championships
Wimbledon Championships